Volcano is a census-designated place (CDP) in Hawaii County, Hawaii, United States located in the District of Puna with a small portion of the CDP in the District of Kaū. The population was 2,575 at the 2010 census, up from 2,231 at the 2000 census.

Geography and climate
Volcano is located on the east side of the island of Hawaii, on the border of Hawaii Volcanoes National Park and near the northeast rim of Kīlauea's summit caldera.

Hawaii Route 11 passes through the southern part of the community, leading northeast  to Hilo and southwest  to Nāālehu.

Demographics

2010 census
As of the census of 2010, there were 2,575 people in 1,228 households residing in the CDP. The racial makeup of the CDP was 51.53% White, 0.74% African American, 0.39% American Indian & Alaska Native, 11.57% Asian, 9.79% Native Hawaiian & Pacific Islander, 0.43% from other races, and 25.55% from two or more races. Hispanic or Latino of any race were 8.82% of the population.

There were 1,228 households, out of which 17.6% had children under the age of 18 living with them.  The average household size was 2.10.

In the Volcano CDP the population was spread out, with 17.3% under the age of 18, 5.4% from 18 to 24, 8.8% from 25 to 34, 16.4% from 35 to 49, 34.6% from 50 to 64, and 17.5% who were 65 years of age or older.  For every 100 females, there were 99.3 males.  For every 100 males there were 100.7 females.

2000 census
As of the census of 2000, there were 2,231 people, 896 households, and 498 families residing in the CDP. There were 1,229 housing units at an average density of 21.7 per square mile (8.4/km2). The racial makeup of the CDP was 47.87% White, 0.49% African American, 0.54% Native American, 11.39% Asian, 12.24% Pacific Islander, 1.34% from other races, and 26.13% from two or more races. Hispanic or Latino of any race were 9.28% of the population.

There were 896 households, out of which 24.6% had children under the age of 18 living with them, 41.4% were married couples living together, 9.5% had a female householder with no husband present, and 44.4% were non-families. 34.7% of all households were made up of individuals, and 7.5% had someone living alone who was 65 years of age or older.  The average household size was 2.25 and the average family size was 2.92.

In the CDP the population was spread out, with 20.3% under the age of 18, 6.7% from 18 to 24, 30.7% from 25 to 44, 30.3% from 45 to 64, and 11.9% who were 65 years of age or older.  The median age was 41 years. For every 100 females, there were 116.2 males.  For every 100 females age 18 and over, there were 125.2 males.

The median income for a household in the CDP was $35,977, and the median income for a family was $44,432. Males had a median income of $30,929 versus $31,679 for females. The per capita income for the CDP was $18,913.  About 10.4% of families and 14.3% of the population were below the poverty line, including 15.0% of those under age 18 and 2.3% of those age 65 or over.

Notable residents
Garrett Hongo (b. 1951), poet, current professor of creative writing at the University of Oregon
Jason Scott Lee (b. 1966), actor, martial artist, founder of the Ulua Theatre in Volcano
Dietrich Varez (1939-2018) Dietrich Varez (born in Berlin, Germany)  printmaker-painter.

References

Census-designated places in Hawaii County, Hawaii
Populated places on Hawaii (island)